Olga Govortsova and Valeria Savinykh were the defending champions but Govortsova chose not to participate. 

Savinykh partnered Yanina Wickmayer, but lost in the final to Caroline Dolehide and Maria Sanchez, 6–3, 6–4.

Seeds

Draw

Draw

References

External Links
Main Draw

Dow Tennis Classic - Doubles